The Zeitschrift für Gerontologie und Geriatrie (English: Journal for Gerontology and Geriatrics) is a peer-reviewed medical journal covering gerontology and geriatrics. It is published 8 times a year in German by Springer Science+Business Media. The journal was established in 1968 as the Zeitschrift für Gerontologie, obtaining its current title in 1995.

Abstracting and indexing
The journal is abstracted and indexed in:

According to the Journal Citation Reports, the journal has a 2017 impact factor of 1.160.

References

External links

Gerontology journals
Publications established in 1968
Springer Science+Business Media academic journals
German-language journals
Academic journals of Germany